WISD is an acronym that may refer to:
 Independent School Districts in Texas - W
 Washtenaw Intermediate School District
 Weidenfeld Institute for Strategic Dialogue
Wine Industry Smoke Detector; pronounced Wizard!